Noel Pearson (born 25 June 1965) is an Australian lawyer, academic, land rights activist and founder of the Cape York Institute for Policy and Leadership, an organisation promoting the economic and social development of Cape York.

Pearson came to prominence as an advocate for Indigenous Australians' rights to land – a position he maintains. Since the end of the 1990s his focus has encompassed a range of additional issues: he has strongly argued that Indigenous policy needs to change direction, notably in relation to welfare, substance abuse, child protection, education and economic development. Pearson criticises approaches to these problems which, while claiming to be "progressive", in his opinion merely keep Indigenous people dependent on welfare and out of the "real economy". He outlined this position in 2000 in his speech, The light on the hill.

In the first decade of the 2000s, Pearson began outlining an alternative to traditional left-wing politics that he called radical centrism. One part of his selected writings is entitled "The Quest for a Radical Centre".

In November 2019, it was announced that Pearson would be one of 20 members of the Senior Advisory Group set up to help co-design the Indigenous voice to government.

Early life
Pearson was born in Cooktown, Queensland and grew up at Hope Vale, Queensland, a Lutheran Mission in the Cape York Peninsula. He is the son of Glen Pearson, from the Bagaarrmugu, and Ivy Pearson, from the Guggu Yalanji. His brother is Gerhardt Pearson. After attending primary school in Hope Vale, Pearson became a boarder at St Peters Lutheran College in Brisbane. Pearson graduated from the University of Sydney with degrees in history and law. His history thesis focused on the Hope Vale Lutheran Mission, and was published by the History Department in "Maps Dreams History."

1990s
In 1990 Pearson co-founded the Cape York Land Council, and resigned in 1996. In 1993 Pearson acted as representative to the traditional owners in the first land claim to the Flinders Island and Cape Melville National Parks, a claim which was successful, although the owners have yet to receive title. He continues to advise a number of Indigenous organisations in Cape York.

In 1993, he was one of six Indigenous Australians who jointly presented the Boyer Lectures "Voices of the Land" for the International Year of the World's Indigenous People (IYWIP).

Following the Mabo decision of the High Court of Australia Pearson played a key part in negotiations over the Native Title Act 1993 (Cth) as a member of the Indigenous negotiating team.

2000s
On 12 August 2000, Pearson delivered the Ben Chifley Memorial Lecture The light on the hill, with an important statement of his transformed views on Indigenous policy.

In 2004, he became the Director of the Cape York Institute for Policy and Leadership.

On 15 December 2006, Pearson publicly criticised the Queensland Director of Public Prosecutions, Leanne Clare, in relation to her decision not to press charges against the police officer involved in the 2004 Palm Island death in custody of Palm Island resident Mulrunji. On 26 January 2007, Pearson welcomed the decision to prosecute the officer, after the inquiry by Sir Laurence Street found there was sufficient evidence to press charges. Pearson also argued, however, that a 20- or 30-year plan was necessary for Palm Island.

On 11 May 2007, Pearson and Indigenous Affairs Minister Mal Brough launched a new welfare scheme for Pearson's home town of Hope Vale. The scheme offers funds for home improvements, and low interest loans for home ownership. On 24 May, Pearson published White guilt, victimhood and the quest for a radical centre, a lengthy account of his understanding of the challenges of policy formulation and enactment.

On 14 June 2007, Pearson launched a report by the Cape York Institute on welfare reform. The report was welcomed by Indigenous Affairs Minister Mal Brough.

On 17 September 2007, with Prime Minister Howard facing probable electoral defeat, Noel Pearson sent him a 6,000-word letter, arguing that Howard's best chance at re-election was to make a dramatic gesture in relation to reconciliation with the Aboriginal population. Pearson argued that Howard needed to promise a referendum on recognition of the indigenous population, and also that Howard was in a unique position to affect the course of indigenous relations, but only if Howard "bared his soul" to the Australian electorate. Howard accepted Pearson's advice, and on 11 October announced plans for a referendum, but was nevertheless comprehensively defeated at the election.

In November 2014, Pearson received effusive praise for his eulogy for former Prime Minister Gough Whitlam, which was hailed in the Australian media as "one of the best political speeches of our time".

In November 2019, it was announced that Pearson would be one of 20 members of the Senior Advisory Group to help co-design the Indigenous voice to government set up by Ken Wyatt, the Minister for Indigenous Australians. The Group is co-chaired by Wyatt, Marcia Langton and Tom Calma.

2020s
On 27 October 2022, Pearson gave the first of his Boyer Lectures, Who we were and who we can be: 'Recognition' In these lectures Pearson explores the proposal to amend the Australian Constitution to recognise Aboriginal and Torres Strait Islander peoples as the First Peoples of Australia through an Indigenous Voice to Parliament.

Views

Support for Northern Territory intervention
On 20 June 2007, Pearson argued for the necessity of intervention in relation to Aboriginal child sexual abuse. On 21 June, in response to a report entitled "Little Children are Sacred," Australian Prime Minister John Howard declared that problems of child abuse in Northern Territory Aboriginal communities had reached a crisis point, and he initiated the "national emergency response". The response involved a series of interventions including, among other things, the suspension of the Racial Discrimination Act, compulsory management of Aboriginal people's income, the deployment of police and health workers, abolition of the permit system, compulsory acquisition of Aboriginal land and a ban on alcohol. Pearson indicated qualified support for these measures, but has received some criticism for doing so. On 18 July, the Indigenous Affairs Minister announced that the federal government would fund the welfare reform trials in Cape York recommended in From Hand Out to Hand Up.

Pearson's position on the intervention found both support and opposition from other Indigenous leaders and members of the Australian community. On 30 November 2007, leading Indigenous academic Marcia Langton argued for the necessity of the emergency response in the Northern Territory. Langton supported Pearson's suggestions to shut down alcohol outlets and establish children's commissions and shelters in each community. On 7 December, on the other hand, Philip Martin, who worked on the Welfare Reform Project in Aurukun for Pearson's Cape York Partnerships between November 2006 and May 2007, argued that Pearson's welfare reform approach cannot work unless other problems, such as inadequate policing and housing, are also addressed.

It was reported on 20 September 2007 that on 12 August Pearson had brokered a secret meeting between Mal Brough and Northern Territory Indigenous leader Galarrwuy Yunupingu. At the meeting Yunupingu changed his position in relation to the Northern Territory emergency response: rather than opposing the measures, Yunupingu decided the intervention was instead an opportunity for the Indigenous community. Yunupingu also signed a memorandum of understanding regarding a 99-year lease to be held over his community of Gunyangara (Ski Beach) in Arnhem Land. He also agreed to set up a council of elders in the Northern Territory to advise the government on the course of the intervention.

Yunupingu subsequently reversed his position on the intervention, saying that it has failed and is "It is now three years old but it hasn't made Aboriginal people any richer or healthier or happier. It is really and truly dragging people down to create more misery… Let's start again."

Speaking in response to the Aurukun rape case involving a 10-year-old girl, Pearson said on 12 December 2007 that the case was "the tip of a tragic iceberg," and that there should be no hesitation in taking Aboriginal children out of dysfunctional and dangerous family circumstances. He did not, however, support calls to extend the Northern Territory emergency intervention to Queensland. Pearson argued on 15 December that the sexual abuse of Aboriginal children may be lessened by establishing a "Families Responsibilities Commission" charged with making decisions about whether welfare recipients are fulfilling their obligations. Prime Minister Rudd ruled out extending the intervention to Queensland in the near future, but stated that he was in discussion with the Queensland government about Pearson's proposal for a "Families Responsibilities Commission."

Constitutional amendments
On 24 November 2007, the day of the Australian federal election, Pearson strongly attacked the opposition leader Kevin Rudd for reneging, two days before the election, on his commitment to seek constitutional recognition for Indigenous Australians. Rudd had initially pledged bipartisan support for John Howard's proposal, made on the first day of the election campaign, to pursue a referendum recognising Indigenous Australians, but it was reported on 23 November that Rudd had stated that, should he win the election, he was "unlikely to pursue Mr Howard's plan for a reconciliation preamble." The day after Rudd won the election, Labor Senator Penny Wong defended their policy of concentrating on practical rather than symbolic measures, aimed at narrowing the gap between Indigenous and other Australians.

Pearson has called for constitutional amendments in two areas, "one symbolic and the other substantive":
 An appropriate preamble [recognising Indigenous people in the Constitution]
 Anew head of power, which provides constitutional authority for the proposed national agreement along the lines that had been proposed by the Makarrata Report of the Senate Legal and Constitutional Affairs Committee in 1983."

In April 2008, after attending the Australia 2020 Summit, Pearson argued that any proposed constitutional reform aimed at recognising indigenous Australians must be in a form acceptable to a wide range of the Australian population. He therefore indicated his belief that a "domestic agreement" would be preferable to a treaty between sovereign states.

On 12 February 2008, the eve of the parliamentary apology to the Stolen Generations, Pearson explained his own complex and conflicted views on the question of an apology.

Pearson argued in August 2008 that welfare benefits should not be granted to indigenous Australians under the age of 21.

Wild Rivers debate
On 14 November 2007, it was reported that Pearson had accused the Queensland government of Anna Bligh, and the federal Labor opposition led by Kevin Rudd, of "selling out Aborigines," saying that a plan to prevent development of the Cape York region was a bid to gain The Greens preferences. Pearson argued that at the very moment when welfare reform was being attempted in Cape York, economic opportunities for the Aboriginal population would be "shot down" by such a move.

In April 2009, Pearson went on temporary leave from Director of the Cape York Institute he had established in 2004 (though claimed at the time he was stepping down altogether). Pearson objected to legislation introduced by the Queensland government declaring certain rivers on indigenous land to be "wild rivers." He stated that he felt this legislation, which would make economic development of the river areas difficult or impossible, was an attempt by the Anna Bligh government to maintain close links with the Greens for electoral purposes, and that it ran counter to the interests of the local indigenous population. He stated that he had therefore decided to resign his Directorship in order to return to the land rights issues which had formerly been his major preoccupation. It was later revealed that Pearson in fact did not step down from the Directorship and only took temporary leave.

In 2009 Pearson published a collection of his writings under the title Up from the Mission: Selected Writings as well as a Quarterly Essay titled Radical Hope: Education and equality in Australia.

Personal life
In August 2012 Pearson revealed that he had undergone four months of chemotherapy for lymphatic cancer.

In May 2017, as part of a confidential legal settlement, The Guardian Australia issued an apology to Noel Pearson over a story they published in January 2017, which made defamatory claims. The newspaper said it "accepts that the comments regarding Mr Noel Pearson in that article were false, [...] unreservedly retracts the statements made in the article regarding Mr Noel Pearson and apologises for the harm and distress caused to him"

Articles and addresses

2011
When outsiders stir up tensions in tribal societies, 10 September 2011.
Job-service parasites get rich living off the unemployed, 3 September 2011.
National industry policy needn't always be about picking the winners, 27 August 2011.
US consumers can't buy out of this crisis, 20 August 2011.
Yolngu inspire us to pursue all our ambitions, 13 August 2011.
Taking our culture on the road of Adam Smith, 10 August 2011.
Individualism versus communalism, 6 August 2011.
Social policy begets social misery as the Western world fails the poor, 30 July 2011.
Fledgling school for indigenous students mustn't be allowed to fail, 27 June 2011.
Down payments on a hope-filled future, 11 June 2011.
Liberal thinkers are right about power of choice, 28 May 2011.
Speaking one's mother tongue is vital, 21 May 2011.
Fielding's furtive turnaround, 14 May 2011.
Hats off to Katter's grand plan, 7 May 2011.
Education guru teaching to the converted, 30 April 2011.
Education and aspiration keys to membership of an open society, 23 April 2011.
Sparring tribes miss humanitarian point, 16 April 2011.
Addiction fed by gap between life's rewards, 9 April 2011.
Time given to principals can make difference, 2 April 2011.
Backroom deals bless their wildest dreams, 19 March 2011.
Djarragun still a beacon of indigenous hope, 12 March 2011.
Proof of welfare's multiple failings, 5 March 2011.
The smoke must clear before we close the gap, 26 February 2011.
Opportunity missed in Gillard's speech about indigenous responsibility, 19 February 2011.
US liberal exposed flaw of welfare policies, 12 February 2011.
Inspired leadership stared down eye of storm, 5 February 2011.
Seek indigenous views ahead of full referendum, 29 January 2011.
Aboriginal referendum a test of national maturity, 26 January 2011.

2010
The fight of his life, 24 December 2010.
Progress brightens indigenous prospects, 18 December 2010.
Disputation threatens to bring misery to the west, 11 December 2010.
A way forward for Aborigines, 8 December 2010.
Indigenous people taken out for a spin, 4 December 2010.
Mate, there's a job to be done, 9 October 2010.
Decision is in: Wild Rivers laws stink, 2 October 2010.
States addicted to pokie profits, 18 September 2010.
Right crucial to Aboriginal reforms, 11 September 2010.
Failed party in search of a purpose, 4 September 2010.
Indigenes still in the political wilderness, 7 August 2010.
Conservatism, too, is relevant to our culture, 31 July 2010.
Adam Smith and closing the gap, 24 July 2010.
A question of basic duty and financial trust, 17 July 2010.
An ideal man to finish the business, 3 July 2010.
For economic progress, lean to the right, 26 June 2010.
Macklin leads way with conditional welfare, 23 June 2010.
Obama misses a historic opportunity, 19 June 2010.
Aborigines need to turn radical, 5 June 2010.
Promise of Mabo not yet realised, 29 May 2010.
The poor remain economic military conscripts, 22 May 2010.
Challenges of the First World, 15 May 2010.
Education reform lies buried under the morass, 8 May 2010.
Senators, start up the intangible engine of human motivation, 24 April 2010.
Give power to our people, 17 April 2010.
Cape York Aborigines go into a divided wilderness, 10 April 2010.
Abbott's bill would reverse the injustice of Wild Rivers laws, 3 April 2010.
Some magic bullets for education, 27 March 2010.
It's uplifting to stand on ceremony, 20 March 2010.
Rudd should defend his legacy, not Bligh's law, 11 February 2010.
Social housing rips the heart out of indigenous communities, 6 February 2010.
When welfarism takes over, disaster will follow, 30 January 2010.
Fattest hand is first in the till, 23 January 2010.
Labor connives with green alliance to control indigenous growth, 16 January 2010.
Reconciliation must come with the republic, 14 January 2010.

2009
Give a hardworking bloke the title to his life, 12 December 2009.
Easy riders and raging bulls, 5 December 2009.
Charter for a brighter future, 28 November 2009.
Political pursuit of religion, 21 November 2009.
Radical Hope: Education and equality in Australia, October 2009.
A people's survival, 3 October 2009.
Opening address, Brisbane Writers Festival, 9 September 2009 (broadcast 16 September).
Calma approach proves too timid, 29 August 2009.
Remedies are the things we suggested, 4 July 2009.
The corporate fallacy, July 2009.
Countdown to close education gap, 21 February 2009.

2008
Man with his work cut out, 8 November 2008.
Offer could aid people who need it, 25 October 2008.
Thinkers, take up the chalk, with Steven Schwartz, 4 September 2008.
Five steps get them off welfare, 9 August 2008.
Obama! What he must do to win, The Monthly 34, May 2008.
No progress without wide support, 26 April 2008.
Agendas of addiction, 1 March 2008.
When words aren't enough, 12 February 2008.
Incentives will bring top teachers, 19 January 2008.
Homes built on despair, 5 January 2008.

2007
Sense of obligation a route out of handout hell, 22 December 2007.
Blame game ends here, 15 December 2007.
Drug abusers should just say sorry, 8 December 2007.
Sorry, we require a synthesis, 1 December 2007.
Reconciliation U-turn shows leader's true colours, 24 November 2007.
Both sides ignore the deeply disadvantaged, 17 November 2007.
All enemies aren't equal, 10 November 2007.
United, we'll fight terrorism, 27 October 2007.
Many paths to reconciliation, 13 October 2007.
Identity on parade, 29 September 2007.
Rudd's reality began with Mundine, 22 September 2007.
Contest could go either way, 15 September 2007.
Big picture required, 1 September 2007.
The urgent quest for a radical political centre, 1 September 2007.
Over 200 years without a place, 25 August 2007.
Edging out the wedge, 18 August 2007.
Tricky hunt for common ground, 11 August 2007.
Through the glass ceiling, 4 August 2007.
More Uncle Toms than meet the eye, 28 July 2007.
Leftist policies pave kids' road to hell, 21 July 2007.
An abyss beyond the bottle, 14 July 2007.
Action only way forward, 7 July 2007.
An avoidable misery, 30 June 2007.
We must all help to stop abuse, 28 June 2007 (edited version of remarks on Lateline, ABC, 26 June 2007).
Politics aside, an end to the tears is our priority, 23 June 2007.
A structure for empowerment, 16 June 2007.
The ideal equilibrium, 9 June 2007.
Mabo legacy is still misunderstood, 2 June 2007.
Where there's life there's Hope, 26 May 2007.
White guilt, victimhood and the quest for a radical centre, Griffith Review, 24 May 2007.
Hand up preferable by far to a handout, 19 May 2007.
Reciprocity resurrected, 12 May 2007.
When hope is lost we must imagine a future, 5 May 2007.
Choice is not enough, 28 April 2007.
Hunt for the radical centre, 21 April 2007.
Give us help to help ourselves, 17 March 2007.
Native tongues imperilled, 10 March 2007.
Taking ownership, 3 March 2007.
Vale hope in outback hellhole, 17 February 2007.
Stuck on the welfare pedestal, 10 February 2007.
Boom and dust lifestyle, 3 February 2007.
Behind the eight ball, 20 January 2007.
Grist to the legal machine, 6 January 2006.

2006
Failure to act also criminal, 30 December 2006.
Travesty on Palm Island, 23 December 2006.
Join the real world, 16 December 2006.
Labor's ideas mature, 9 December 2006.
Queenslander offers way ahead for ALP, 2 December 2006.
Skewed world view, 25 November 2006.
Uses of layered identities, 18 November 2006.
The right side of the law, 11 November 2006.
Menace of a material world view, 4 November 2006.
Walking in two worlds, 28 October 2006.
A peculiar path that leads astray, 21 October 2006.
Properties of integration, 14 October 2006.
Lessons from Palm Island, 7 October 2006.
Road to responsibility, 30 September 2006.
A mighty moral victory, 23 September 2006.
Layered identities and peace, 23 July 2006.
Don't listen to those who despise us, 26 June 2006.
Big government hurts Aboriginal population, 25 June 2006.
On wild rivers and the Cape York Heads of Agreement, 17 June 2006.
Visions of brighter future can liberate camp dwellers, 7 May 2006.
Arthur Mills oration—On social norms, 7 May 2006.

2005
The Cape York agenda, 5 December 2005.

In search of a sustainable future, 15 November 2005.

Peace and prosperity for Indigenous Australians, 28 October 2005.
Working towards peace and prosperity, 26 October 2005.
People, nations and peace—Mabo oration, 3 June 2005.
National reconciliation planning workshop, 30 May 2005.
Working for a better life, 17 May 2005.
Reconciliation a building block, 19 April 2005.

2004
Video Dhuway / Director, Lew Griffiths ; produced by Noel Pearson, Lew Griffiths; produced in association with SBS Independent.

The dangers of mutual obligation, 15 December 2004.
No danger of another stolen generation, 15 November 2004.
Reading inquiry welcome, 12 November 2004.
Judith Wright memorial lecture, 5 September 2004.
We need real reform for Indigenous public schooling, 25 August 2004.
Two stories of Indigenous affairs, 27 July 2004.

2003
Neglect, not injustice, is the enemy, 30 October 2003.
Underlying principles of a new policy for the restoration of indigenous social order, 23 July 2003.
Land rights and progressive wrongs, Griffith Review, 12 June 2003.
Where we've come from and where we're at with the opportunity that is Koiki Mabo's legacy to Australia, 3 June 2003.
Sir Ninian Stephen annual lecture: The High Court’s Abandonment of ‘The Time-Honoured Methodology of the Common Law’ in its Interpretation of Native Title in Mirriuwung Gajerrong and Yorta Yorta, 17 March 2003.

2002
Hawke lecture, 3 November 2002.
Native title's days in the sun are over, 28 August 2002.
Labor can benefit from real Aboriginal reform, 20 August 2002.
Address to the CIS consilium, 1 August 2002.
Dr Lawrence, it's not an issue of left or right, 30 May 2002.

2001
What Cape York communities can do to help themselves, 15 June 2001.

2000
How the Commonwealth Government can help stop Aboriginal welfare dependency, 15 December 2000.
The light on the hill, 12 August 2000.

1993 
The Goss Government: Promise and Performance of Labor in Queensland. Ed B Stevens and J Wanna. "Time for Leadership: Issues of Importance for Aboriginal and Torres Strait Islander People." Annie Holden and Noel Pearson, CAPSM.

1987
Anthropology and tradition: A contemporary Aboriginal viewpoint, with Mervyn Gibson.

Collections of articles
2007 articles.
2006 articles.
2005 articles.
2004 articles.
Speeches.
Position papers.
Articles compiled by Cape York Partnerships, 2001–2004.

Profiles and interviews
Need to embrace Aboriginal success, Lateline, ABC, 15 April 2013.
Noel Pearson on Aboriginal education, The 7.30 Report, ABC, 1 October 2009.
Pearson calls for end to passive welfare, The 7.30 Report, ABC, 12 December 2007.
The Cape experiment, transcript of Four Corners episode, ABC, 16 July 2007. Downloads of the program and of an address by Pearson to the Hope Vale community available here.
Noel Pearson discusses the issues faced by Indigenous communities,  Lateline, ABC, 26 June 2007.
Pearson explains plan to overhaul Aboriginal welfare,  The 7.30 Report, ABC, 19 June 2007.
Pearson's revolution, The Age, 28 October 2006.
The new deal, Sydney Morning Herald, 28 October 2006 (short version of above).
Action needed to stop ongoing Aboriginal crisis: Pearson, The 7.30 Report, ABC, 22 June 2006.
Pearson calls for end to passive welfare, The 7.30 Report, ABC, 14 November 2005.
The Cape crusade, Australian Story, ABC, 11 November 2002 (extended transcript available here).
Noel Pearson, Background Briefing, ABC, 29 October 2000.

Short biographies
Noel Pearson, Cape York Partnerships.
Noel Pearson, Brisbane Institute.

References

1965 births
Australian indigenous rights activists
Lawyers from Brisbane
Living people
Radical centrist writers
Sydney Law School alumni